Winter People is a 1989 American romantic-drama film directed by Ted Kotcheff, and starring Kurt Russell and Kelly McGillis. It is based on the novel by John Ehle. Wayland Jackson, a widower with a young daughter, moves to a small, impoverished mountain village in North Carolina, circa 1934. They are taken in by Collie Wright, a single mother, and she and Wayland soon fall in love.

Plot
Young widowed clockmaker Wayland Jackson and his 12-year-old daughter, Paula, enter a small Depression-era community in the Appalachian Mountains literally by accident. Wayland becomes acquainted with Collie Wright (a single mother with a newborn child, Jonathan) who gives them shelter from the cold. As he becomes more familiar to the villagers, Wayland tries to persuade them that he could build a beautiful clock for the public square. His proposal is met with considerable skepticism, and then he is given the town's consent.

He is attracted to Collie, but their lives are threatened by family members from the Wright family's rival clan, the Campbells, led by patriarch Drury. The youngest son, Cole, is the father of Collie's baby. Cole wanted to run away with Collie but ultimately left her, fearing Drury's wrath. One night, Cole Campbell arrives in Collie's cabin, and goes into a violent rage once he learns of Collie and Wayland's relationship. Wayland and Cole get into a fistfight in the frozen pond near the cabin. Cole is found dead the next morning, whereupon his relatives demand that the Wrights now owe them a life. To save the lives of her brothers and Jackson, Collie gives them Cole's child.

Wayland and Collie soon are engaged. Wayland confronts the Campbells and attempts to persuade Drury and his clan to end their feud with the Wrights, but they chase him away. The following spring, Drury appears at the pair's wedding and returns Jonathan to his mother.

Cast

 Kurt Russell as Wayland Jackson
 Kelly McGillis as Collie Wright
 Lloyd Bridges as William Wright
 Mitchell Ryan as Drury Campbell
 Jeffrey Meek as Cole Campbell
 Don Michael Paul as Young Wright
 Lanny Flaherty as Gudger Wright
 Eileen Ryan as Annie Wright
 Amelia Burnette as Paula Jackson
 David Dwyer as Milton Wright

Reception

Critical response
Winter People was poorly received by critics and has an overall approval rating of 20% on Rotten Tomatoes.

References
Notes

External links
 
 
 
 
 

1989 films
Castle Rock Entertainment films
Columbia Pictures films
Films set in the 1930s
1989 romantic drama films
American independent films
Films directed by Ted Kotcheff
Films shot in North Carolina
Films set in North Carolina
American romantic drama films
Films based on American novels
Films scored by John Scott (composer)
1989 independent films
1980s English-language films
1980s American films
Films with screenplays by Carol Sobieski